"Lay Me Down" is a song by English recording artist Pixie Lott from her self-titled third studio album (2014). The song was released on 25 July 2014 as the album's second and final single.

Commercial performance
"Lay Me Down" failed to chart within the top 100 of the UK Singles Chart, peaking at number 114. Nevertheless, the single reached number seventy-eight on the UK Singles Sales Chart.

Music video
The music video for "Lay Me Down" was directed by Ben Falk and filmed in Cannes, France. According to Falk, Lott wanted the video to "evoke the glamour of Brigitte Bardot". The video premiered on 5 June 2014.

Track listings
Digital single
"Lay Me Down" – 3:25

Digital EP
"Lay Me Down" – 3:25
"I Only Want to Be with You" – 2:22
"Cry Baby" – 3:31
"Champion" (Live from the Pool) – 3:01

Charts

References

2014 singles
2014 songs
Pixie Lott songs
Mercury Records singles
Music videos shot in France
Songs written by Adam Pallin